Baker Township, Arkansas may refer to:

 Baker Township, Izard County, Arkansas
 Baker Township, Lafayette County, Arkansas
 Baker Township, Randolph County, Arkansas

See also 
 List of townships in Arkansas
 Baker Township (disambiguation)

Arkansas township disambiguation pages